Achraf Mahboubi (born 8 August 2000) is a Moroccan taekwondo practitioner. In 2021, he represented Morocco at the 2020 Summer Olympics held in Tokyo, Japan.

Career 

He competed in the men's lightweight event at the 2017 World Taekwondo Championships held in Muju, South Korea without winning a medal. He was eliminated in his second match by Kim Hun of South Korea.

At the 2018 African Taekwondo Championships held in Agadir, Morocco, he won the gold medal in the men's 74 kg event. In 2018, he also competed in the men's 80 kg event at the 2018 Mediterranean Games held in Tarragona, Catalonia, Spain without winning a medal. He was eliminated in his second match by Júlio Ferreira of Portugal.

In 2019, he competed in the men's welterweight event at the World Taekwondo Championships in Manchester, United Kingdom without winning a medal. As part of the 2019 World Taekwondo Grand Prix he won one of the bronze medals at the event held in Rome, Italy. In that same year, he also represented Morocco at the 2019 African Games held in Rabat, Morocco and he won the silver medal in the men's 80 kg event.

In 2020, he competed in the men's 80 kg event at the African Olympic Qualification Tournament in Rabat, Morocco and he qualified to represent Morocco at the 2020 Summer Olympics in Tokyo, Japan.

At the 2021 African Taekwondo Championships held in Dakar, Senegal, he won the silver medal in the men's 80 kg event. A few months later, at the 2020 Summer Olympics, he competed in the men's 80 kg event.

Achievements

References

External links 
 

Living people
2000 births
Place of birth missing (living people)
Moroccan male taekwondo practitioners
African Games medalists in taekwondo
African Games gold medalists for Morocco
Competitors at the 2019 African Games
Mediterranean Games competitors for Morocco
Competitors at the 2018 Mediterranean Games
African Taekwondo Championships medalists
Taekwondo practitioners at the 2020 Summer Olympics
Competitors at the 2019 Summer Universiade
Olympic taekwondo practitioners of Morocco
21st-century Moroccan people